The 2008 Nagoya Grampus season was Nagoya Grampus' 16th season in the J. League Division 1 and 27th overall in the Japanese top flight. They also participated in the 2008 J. League Cup, being knocked out at the Semifinal stage by Oita Trinita, and the 2008 Emperor's Cup getting knocked out at the Quarterfinal stage by Gamba Osaka.

Squad

Transfers

Winter

In:

Out:

Competitions

J.League

Results

Table

Emperor's Cup

J.League Cup

Group stage

Knockout phase

Player statistics

Appearances

Goal Scorers

References

External links
  J. League official site

Nagoya Grampus
Nagoya Grampus seasons